Okatibbee Dam is a dam in Lauderdale County, Mississippi.

The earthen gravity dam was constructed in 1968 by the United States Army Corps of Engineers with a height of 72 feet and a length of 6620 at its crest.  It impounds Okatibbee Creek for flood control and municipal drinking water.  The dam is owned and operated by the Corps of Engineers.

The reservoir it creates, Okatibbee Lake, has a water surface of 5.9 square miles, about 28 linear miles of shoreline, a maximum capacity of 59,481 acre-feet, and a normal storage capacity of 46,538 acre-feet.  Recreation includes boating, fishing, camping, hunting, and enjoying the five parks maintained by the Corps, one full service campground and four day-use parks.  Directly north of the lake is the state's Okatibbee State Wildlife Area.

References 

Dams in Mississippi
Reservoirs in Mississippi
United States Army Corps of Engineers dams
Buildings and structures in Lauderdale County, Mississippi
Dams completed in 1968
Landforms of Lauderdale County, Mississippi
Mississippi placenames of Native American origin